The 7th Irish Film & Television Awards took place on 20 February 2010 in the Burlington Hotel, Dublin.
It was hosted by Victoria Smurfit and honoured Irish film and television released in 2009.

Awards in film
Best Film
 The Eclipse (Winner)
 Ondine
 The Secret of Kells
 Zonad
 Eamon

Director in Film
 Jim Sheridan – Brothers (Winner)
 Neil Jordan – Ondine
 John Carney, Kieran Carney – Zonad
 Conor McPherson – The Eclipse

Script Film
 Conor McPherson, Billy Roache – The Eclipse (Winner)
 Neil Jordan – Ondine
 John Carney, Kieran Carney – Zonad
 Margaret Corkery – Eamon

Actor in a lead role
 Colin Farrell – Ondine (Winner)
 Ciarán Hinds – The Eclipse
 Darren Healy – Savage
 Stephen Rea – Nothing personal

Actress in a lead role
 Saoirse Ronan – The Lovely Bones (Winner)
 Janice Byrne – Zonad
 Amy Kirwan – Eamon
 Jade Yourell – Happy Ever Afters

Actor in a Supporting Role Film
 Aidan Quinn – The Eclipse (Winner)
 Simon Delaney – Happy Ever Afters
 Michael Fassbender – Fish Tank
 Michael Gambon – Harry Potter and Half Blood Prince

Actress in a Supporting Role Film
 Dervla Kirwan – Ondine (Winner)
 Anne Marie Duff – Nowhere Boy
 Nora Jane Noone – Savage
 Ger Ryan – Happy Ever Afters

Feature Documentary
 His & Hers (Winner)
 The Bass Player: A song for dad
 Colony
 The Yellow Bittern

International film
Best International Film
 The Hurt Locker  (Winner)
 Avatar 
 Let the Right One In 
 Up 

Best International Actress
 Meryl Streep – It's Complicated
 Marion Cotillard – Nine
 Penélope Cruz – Broken Embraces
 Anna Kendrick – Up in the Air

Best International Actor
 Robert Downey Jr. – Sherlock Holmes
 Sam Rockwell – Moon
 Vincent Cassel – Mesrine: Killer Instinct
 Stanley Tucci – The Lovely Bones

Craft / technical categories (film and television)

Costume Design
 Consolata Boyle – Chéri (Winner)
Joan Bergin – The Tudors
Allison Byrne – Cracks
Eimer Ní Mhaoldomhnaigh – Ondine

Director of Photography
 Suzie Lavelle – One Hundred Mornings (Winner)
Tom Comerford – Savage
Ivan McCullough – The Eclipse
 Ruairí O'Brien – Five Minutes of Heaven

Editing
 Mairead McIvor – Savage (Winner)
Emer Reynolds – The Eclipse
Isobel Stephenson – Pure Mule – The Last Weekend
Ken Wardrop – His & Hers

Make Up & Hair
 The Take – Lorraine Glynn, Morna Ferguson
 Five Minutes of Heaven – Pamela Smyth
 The Tudors – Sharon Doyle, Dee Corcoran
 Zonad – Eileen Buggy, Barbara Conway

Original Score
 Brian Byrne – Zonad
 Neil Hannon – Wide Open Spaces
The Henry Girls – A Shine of Rainbows
 Stephen McKeon – Savage

Production Design
 Anna Rackard – Ondine (Winner)
Tom Conroy – The Tudors
Susie Cullen – The Take
Ashleigh Jeffers – Occupation

Sound
 Ondine – Brendan Deasy, Tom Johnson, Sarah Gaines (Winner)
 The Eclipse – Ronan Hill, Jon Stevenson, John Fitzgerald
 Five Minutes of Heaven – Ronan Hill, Jon Stevenson, John Fitzgerald
Savage – Patrick Hanlon, John Fitzgerald, Fiadhnait McCann

Television drama categories

Single Drama / Drama Serial
 Five Minutes of Heaven Winner
Belonging to Laura
 Best: His Mother's Son
 Father & Son
Rásaí na Gaillimhe

Drama Series / Soap
 The Clinic Winner
 Fair City
  Pure Mule – The Last Weekend
 Ros na Rún
 The Tudors

Director Television
 Thaddeus O'Sullivan – Into the Storm (Winner)
 Ciaran Donnelly – The Tudors
 Robert Quinn – Rásaí na Gaillimhe
Declan Recks – Pure Mule – The Last Weekend 

Script Television
 Frank Deasy – Father & Son (Winner)
 Frank McGuinness – A Short Stay in Switzerland
 Eugene O'Brien – Pure Mule – The Last Weekend 
 James Phelan – Rásaí na Gaillimhe

Actor in a Lead Role – Television
 Brendan Gleeson – Into the Storm (Winner)
 Gabriel Byrne – In Treatment
 Liam Neeson – Five Minutes of Heaven
 Jonathan Rhys Meyers – The Tudors

Actress in a Lead Role – Television
 Elaine Cassidy – Harper's Island (Winner)
 Ruth Bradley – Rásaí na Gaillimhe
 Michelle Fairley – Best: His Mother's Son
 Charlene McKenna – Pure Mule – The Last Weekend 

Actor in a Supporting Role – Television
 Stephen Rea – Father & Son (Winner)
Declan Conlon – Fair City
Diarmuid Noyes – Pure Mule – The Last Weekend 
Owen Roe – Val Falvey, T.D.

Actress in a Supporting Role – Television
 Sarah Bolger – The Tudors (Winner)
Dawn Bradfield – Pure Mule – The Last Weekend 
 Amy Huberman – The Clinic
Tatiana Ouliankina – Belonging to Laura

Television categories

Children's / Youth Programme
 On The Block – Tory Island (Winner)
 Aisling's Diary
 Ballybraddan
 Seacht

Current Affairs
 The Frontline (Winner)
Paul Williams Investigates: The Battle for the Gasfield
 Prime Time Investigates: Travellers – On the Edge
 Spotlight: Stem Cell Tourists

Documentary Series
 Blood of the Irish (Winner) 
Bóthar go dtí an White House
I See A Darkness
Teorainn

Single Documentary
 Seamus Heaney: Out Of The Marvellous (Winner)
Abuse of Trust: Sins of the Fathers
The Forgotten Irish
The House

Entertainment Programme
 Apprentice (Winner)
 The All Ireland Talent Show
The Savage Eye
  Xposé – The Stephen Gately Tribute

News Programme
 TV3 News at 5.30 (Winner)
 BBC Newsline
 City Channel News

Factual Programme
 Nightly News with Vincent Browne (Winner)
 Celebrity Bainisteoir
Killers – O'Reilly
Welcome to my World

Sports
 Grand Slam Journey (Winner)
GAA Beo
Pride of The Parish
 Shay Elliot

Others

Special Irish Language Award
 Rásaí na Gaillimhe (Winner)
CSÍ
 Ros na Rún
 Seacht

Animation
 The Secret of Kells (Winner)
Hasan Everywhere
The Polish Language
Trolley Boy

Short Film
 Runners (Winner)
If I Should Fall Behind
Moore Street Masala
Sunshower

Rising Star Award
 Tomm Moore
 Margaret Corkery
 Darren Healy
 Brendan Muldowney
 Robert Sheehan
 Ken Wardrop

Lifetime Achievement Award
John Boorman

References

External links
 Official Site

2010 in Irish television
7